Etharkkum Thunindhavan is the soundtrack album composed by D. Imman for the upcoming Tamil-language action thriller film of the same name directed by Pandiraj and produced by Sun Pictures, starring Suriya and Priyanka Arul Mohan. The soundtrack has ten tunes; four songs featuring lyrics written by Yugabharathi, Sivakarthikeyan and Vignesh Shivan and the remainder of the album featured instrumental tracks used in the background score. It was released on 31 January 2022.

Development 
The music of the film is composed by D. Imman in his third collaboration with Pandiraj, following Kadaikutty Singam (2018) and Namma Veettu Pillai (2019). Imman was initially roped in for the untitled film with Suriya, which was directed by Siva, and also for Aruvaa, which was directed by Hari. As the projects did not materialise, this film marked the first collaboration with the actor. Yugabharathi and Vignesh Shivan were initially hired for writing the song lyrics. In November 2021, actor Sivakarthikeyan was also announced to pen lyrics for one of the songs in the film.

The composer had worked with an ensemble musical team of 100 musicians to work on the film's soundtrack and background music. In early-December, reports surfaced that G. V. Prakash Kumar will record the introductory track for the film, and Anirudh Ravichander was also roped in to croon for one of the tracks in the album, which consisting of a different genre. Later, the team had officially announced that both the composers had recorded the vocals for the track titled "Vaada Thambi" which was written by Vignesh Shivan. Carnatic musician Brinda Manickavasakan made her debut as a playback singer in feature film, with the track "Ullam Urugudhaiya".

Release 
A promo video of the introductory song "Vaada Thambi", the first single from the album, was released on 16 December, with the full song being unveiled the following day. The lyric video was also launched on the same day, through the official YouTube channel of Sun TV. On 23 December 2021, the lyrical video of the second single "Ullam Urugudhaiya" was unveiled along with the full song. A romantic melody duet, sung by Pradeep Kumar and Vandana Srinivasan, the track and the first line of the song is inspired from the religious song of the same name, sung by T. M. Soundararajan, for Lord Murugan. It was marketed as a "romantic melody with divine musical backdrop" and featured Suriya in the costumes of Lord Murugan, a warrior prince and a king in the track. It received a million views within hours after its release. On 3 January 2022, the third single track "Summa Surrunu", sung by Armaan Malik and Nikhita Gandhi was released, touted to be a "quirky" number.

On 30 January, the makers unveiled the film's theme music and original background score through YouTube, a month before the film's release in March 2022. The tracks were later bundled into the film's soundtrack album and was released separately into music platforms, the following day (31 January 2022).

The soundtrack for the dubbed versions in Telugu, Hindi, Malayalam and Kannada were released on 4 March 2022.

Track listing

Tamil

Telugu

Hindi

Malayalam

Kannada

Notes

References 

2022 soundtrack albums
Tamil film soundtracks
Hindi film soundtracks
D. Imman soundtracks